Switch Aberdeen is the name of the DAB multiplex operator for the Aberdeen area. The company was one of two applicants for the licence - the other was from Score Digital. The service is currently carried on four transmitters and as required, has to carry the two BBC regional services, BBC Radio Scotland and BBC Radio nan Gaidheal.

Transmitter sites 
Switch Aberdeen currently broadcasts on the following sites:

Current line-up of services 

The stations currently carried on Switch Aberdeen are:

Original line-up 
The following is the original line-up on the platform and what happened, if anything.

Other services 
The following list are other services which were available at some point on the platform:

References

Digital audio broadcasting multiplexes